It is estimated that 150 million people are homeless worldwide. Habitat for Humanity estimated in 2016 that 1.6 billion people around the world live in "inadequate shelter".

Different countries often use different definitions of homelessness. It can be defined by living in a shelter, being in a transitional phase of housing and living in a place not fit for human habitation. The numbers may take into account internal displacement from conflict, violence and natural disasters, but may or may not take into account chronic and transitional homelessness, making direct comparisons of numbers complicated.

List

See also
 List of countries by home ownership rate

References

endhomelessness.org

Homeless
Homelessness